Trithemis hartwigi is a species of dragonfly in the family Libellulidae. It is found in Cameroon and Equatorial Guinea. Its natural habitat is subtropical or tropical moist lowland forests.

References 

hartwigi
Taxonomy articles created by Polbot
Insects described in 1970